The 1985 Victorian state election was held on 2 March 1985.

Seat changes
A number of members contested different seats to the ones they held:
A group of Liberal MLCs contested Legislative Assembly seats:
Boronia MLC Gracia Baylor contested Warrandyte.
Ballarat MLC Clive Bubb contested Ballarat South.
Western MLC Digby Crozier contested Portland.
Monash MLC Don Hayward contested Prahran.
Liberal MLA Bill Ebery (Midlands) contested the Legislative Council province of North Western.
Labor MLA Bob Miller (Prahran) contested the Legislative Council province of Monash.
A number of MLAs contested different seats:
Ascot Vale Labor MLA Tom Edmunds contested Pascoe Vale.
Bendigo Labor MLA David Kennedy contested Bendigo West.
Dandenong Labor MLA Rob Jolly contested Doveton.
Dromana Labor MLA David Hassett contested Mornington.
Evelyn Labor MLA Max McDonald contested Whittlesea.
Frankston Labor MLA Jane Hill contested Frankston North.
Geelong East Labor MLA Graham Ernst contested Bellarine.
Geelong West Labor MLA Hayden Shell contested Geelong.
Glenhuntly Labor MLA Gerard Vaughan contested Clayton.
Glenroy Labor MLA Jack Culpin contested Broadmeadows.
Heatherton Labor MLA Peter Spyker contested Mentone.
Noble Park Labor MLA Terry Norris contested Dandenong.
Sandringham Labor MLA Graham Ihlein contested Evelyn.
Westernport Liberal MLA Alan Brown contested Gippsland West.

Retiring Members

Labor
John Wilton MLA (Broadmeadows)
Glyde Butler MLC (Thomastown)
Eric Kent MLC (Chelsea)

Liberal
Cec Burgin MLA (Polwarth)
Walter Jona MLA (Hawthorn)
Don McKellar MLA (Portland)
Jeannette Patrick MLA (Brighton)
Don Saltmarsh MLA (Wantirna)
Peter Block MLC (Nunawading)
Vasey Houghton MLC (Templestowe)
John Radford MLC (Bendigo)

Legislative Assembly
Sitting members are shown in bold text. Successful candidates are highlighted in the relevant colour. Where there is possible confusion, an asterisk (*) is also used.

Legislative Council
Sitting members are shown in bold text. Successful candidates are highlighted in the relevant colour. Where there is possible confusion, an asterisk (*) is also used.

References

Psephos - Adam Carr's Election Archive

Victoria
Candidates for Victorian state elections